Strawberry Jam is the seventh studio album by American experimental pop band Animal Collective. It was released in September 2007, the band's first on Domino Records. It was accompanied by the singles "Peacebone" and "Fireworks." The album was the band's first to chart on the Billboard 200, debuting and peaking at #72.

Recording
The album was recorded at Wave Lab Studios in Tucson, Arizona. Band member Brian Weitz explained why they chose this location on the Collected Animals message board : "dave [Portner] and i were talking a few months back about environments to record and one of us was like maybe it'd be sweet to make this next one a desert record and then everyone was like yeah man we haven't done that yet and it seems like it could fit the songs and the way we want them to sound. that might not make sense to anyone but us." They finally settled on Tucson, where Weitz had previously lived. Moreover, Strawberry Jam engineer Scott Colburn, who also worked with the band to record the predecessor Feels, knew Wave Lab's owner. According to member Noah Lennox, it was a conscious decision to record the album "in a desert setting."

The group, particularly Josh Dibb, struggled during the recording of Strawberry Jam, with Portner stating it was "the first time we ran into a situation where we weren’t completely satisfied with what was happening". As it was their first album for Domino, they were fearful of turning in what they felt was a difficult record. However, label manager Peter Berard assured the band the songs were "incredible", noting that they had a clarity that was absent from previous albums, and that they would appeal to newcomers and possibly expand their commercial potential.

Album content

The title and track listing were revealed by band member Geologist on the Collected Animals message board on May 16, 2007.  In a pre-release interview with Billboard, guitarist Deakin/Josh Dibb described the new album as "chiseled" and "shiver-inducing". According to the interview, the majority of the album's songs were played on the band's live shows from 2005 to 2006, but that there would be, "nonetheless, a few new ones that we've never played live."

Two songs that had been played extensively on the band's 2005–2006 concerts, "Safer" and "Street Flash", were not included on Strawberry Jam. Regarding the songs' absences, singer and guitarist Avey Tare/David Portner wrote to fans that the band recorded studio versions for both, but decided against including them on the album, "partially due to their length[s]". "Safer" was eventually released as the B-side of the album's first single, "Peacebone", while "Street Flash" and other studio leftovers appeared on the 2008 EP Water Curses.

About the content of "Peacebone", Portner said in an interview with BBC:

Title and cover art
The name Strawberry Jam came from singer and drummer Panda Bear as he and the band were on a plane headed to Greece for a show. Upon receiving his complimentary tray of food, he opened up the packet of strawberry jam that had been provided for the bread. As he removed the cover of the packet, he was drawn to the look of the glistening jam, and he expressed his desire for the production of their new album to sound like the jam looked, "that is to say, something that's really synthetic and sharp and futuristic looking," but also "tangy and sweet, almost in a kind of aggressive way in terms of the way it tastes".

Avey Tare created and photographed the cover art. Additional layout and design was done by Rob Carmichael, with whom Animal Collective has collaborated on several other projects.

Internet leak
The album's Internet leak on June 12, 2007, was notable in that it was leaked in three song clusters over a period of weeks.  Geologist wrote on the Collected Animals board that the first batch of promotional copies were watermarked, and that each journalist's name would be digitally embedded in any extracted files. On June 19, 2007, a letter from the band's publicist was sent to music journalists regarding the leaking of the first three songs:

Panda Bear talked with Shout Mouth regarding the band's thoughts on the leak:

The remaining three tracks—"Fireworks", "Cuckoo Cuckoo" and "Derek"—were all leaked on July 4, 2007.

Reception

The album received a normalized rating of 79 out of 100 (based on 34 reviews from mainstream critics) from Metacritic, indicating generally favourable reviews. In a positive review, Mark Richardson of Pitchfork described the band as having mastered "its distinctive experimental approach to songwriting, folding celebration, longing, doubt, loss, and acceptance into complex hooks and choruses." Pitchfork also ranked Strawberry Jam 6 in their Top 50 Albums of 2007 list. AllMusic's Thom Jurek called Strawberry Jam the band's "most primal yet most sophisticated record... to date," and praised the unresolved tension pitting Panda Bear's "bubbling sunshine pop" and "goodwill toward everything" against "[Avey] Tare's utter sense of alienation, his strangeness -- and estrangement -- from the limits and inconveniences of the human body and its politics, and his questioning of his own place in human relationships and interactions." Meanwhile, Erik Davis of Spin was more lukewarm in his review, rating the album three out of five stars and saying that it "rides the line between childlike and childish." Mojo called it "an album of mischievous melody, fairground keyboards, cut'n'paste aural collage and an undeniable love of pop all but buried in junk shop Dadaist clatter."

As of 2012, Strawberry Jam has sold 84,000 copies.

Track listing

Personnel
Credits adapted from the liner notes of Strawberry Jam.

Animal Collective/"Strawberry Band"
 Avey Tare – performance
 Deakin (credited as "Deacon" on packaging) – performance
 Geologist – performance
 Panda Bear – performance

Technical personnel
 Scott Colburn – recording engineering
 Nicolas Vernhes – mixing, additional tracking
 Alan Douches – mastering

References

2007 albums
Animal Collective albums
Domino Recording Company albums
Experimental pop albums